Samovodene is a village in Veliko Tarnovo Municipality, north-central Bulgaria.

Geography 
The village is located about 10 km north of Veliko Tarnovo. Near the village is the source of the river Rakovets.

Neighborhoods 
The village is divided into three neighborhoods
 Inns (Bulgarian: Ханища)
 White Soil (Bulgarian: Бяла Пръст)
 Yoke (Bulgarian: Кобилица)

Population

Religion 
The Orthodox church "Saint Irina" was built in the 1840s. Christians.

Families from the village Samovodene 
 Alakov (Алъкови)
 Baychev (Байчеви) 
 Vachev (Вачеви)
 Gantsarov (Ганцарови)
 Glushkov (Глушкови)
 Dankov (Данкови)
 Evtimov (Евтимови)
 Karadachev (Карадачеви)
 Kovachev (Ковачеви)
Kukumeev (Кукумееви)
 Maslyankov (Маслянкови)
 Pangelov (Пангелови)
 Patrikov (Патрикови)
 Chuklev (Чуклеви)
 Hinov (Хинови)

History 
In the land of Samovodene revealed early Neolithic settlement (6000 BC on.. It is.). Remarkably open house with an area of 120 m². Studied is unique religious complex, consisting of a religious building, religious and cult pit shaft with a radius of 1.80 m and a depth of 12.80 meters incurred in connection with the ritual practices of the cult of the sun and the Great Mother Goddess. Another phenomenal finding a plastic image of a young girl on the wall of pottery aged 8400 years, modeled so skillfully that the outside environment undistorted by later construction activities layer could be assigned to the classical period of ancient times. This proves the existence of a division of labor and specialization in craft skills at an early Neolithic.

In the village there were two primary schools "Father Paysii" and "Tsar Simeon". In Samovodene was founded Credit cooperative "Strength", which was later renamed the consumer. Cooperative "Vasil Mavrikov" was created in 1945. Community center in the village Samovodene was founded in 1873.

Cultural and natural attractions 
 In the village is private ethnographic museum "Maslyankovi and Sons" The museum occupies an area 500 m². It has over 800 exhibits. Free entrance. Welcomes visitors year-round, anytime.
 Near the center "Izvor" is a fountain built in memory of the fallen guerrillas Ivan Monkov and Kiril Tananeev.
"Preobrazhenski Manastir" is a Monastery located 7 kilometers away from Veliko Tarnovo, near the left coast of Yantra River, at a walking distance away from Samovodene. The monastery dates back to the 14th century when it was founded by the queen Teodora-Sara and Ivan Shishman.

Transport 
Railway station is on the line Gorna Oryahovitsa - Veliko Tarnovo - Stara Zagora.

There is a regular bus line №10 of Gorna Oryahovitsa, Veliko Tarnovo and Parvomaytsi.

Buildings

Education 
 Primary School "Hristo Smirnenski" (Principal - Lilyana Getsova)
 Library "Izgrev" (Principal - Elka Petrova)
 Community Center "Izvor" (Mayor of Samovodene - Nikoilai Milaikovski)
 Kindergarten "Samovodene"

Other 
 Private Ethnographic Museum "Maslyankov and Sons"
 Club of pensioners and disabled people "Rodolyubets" (Principal - Vasilka Popova)
 Church "Saint Irene"
 Youth Centre

Regular events 
 The feast of the village is on 5 May. Then celebrate the Christian holiday "Saint Irene" is called and the church in the village.
 Every year on St. George ignite two large fire: one - one half of the village on the hill rocker and the other - the hill Mryamora by making a race which fire will be higher. For this purpose from the beginning of the year to collect tires and materials for bonfires. And most characteristic is that since he started the tradition, the fire on the hill rocker is always great!

Sport 

In the village Samovodene of about 65 years has soccer. The terraces of the stadium are about 300-400 spectators. The base is available to all Samovodene citizens.

The team of the village is called "Sparta" (FC Samovodene).

Notable people

Born at the village 
Antoaneta Todorova - Retired female javelin thrower

Died at the village 
 Trifon Ivanov (1965-2016)

Other 
 On 23/11/2009, BNT reported homeless old man grandfather Mitko helpless left without relatives willing to help him. 
 On 07/12/2015, the Nova TV reported Lilly from Samovodene who died just days before turning 15 years. 
 On 29/11/2016, the newspaper "Today" reported from the theater Samovodene who won the award in Serbia.  
 On 07/12/2016, the Eurocom Tsarevets reported resident of the village of Samovodene which became a hit on social networks because of videos that they upload to the Internet.
 On 17.11.2016, the newspaper "Destant" reported Camellia Kandeva from Samovodene which is 16 years old and already has behind her numerous awards for modern ballet.

References 

Villages in Veliko Tarnovo Province